This is a complete list of current bridges and other crossings of the Ohio River from the mouth at the Mississippi River at Cairo, Illinois to the confluence of the Allegheny and Monongahela Rivers at Pittsburgh, Pennsylvania.

Illinois–Kentucky

Indiana–Kentucky

Ohio–Kentucky

Ohio–West Virginia

Pennsylvania 

The source of the Ohio River is at the confluence of the Allegheny River and the Monongahela River at Pittsburgh, Pennsylvania.

See also

 List of crossings of the Allegheny River
 List of crossings of the Cumberland River
 List of crossings of the Green River
 List of crossings of the Monongahela River
 List of crossings of the Tennessee River
 List of crossings of the Lower Mississippi River
 List of crossings of the Upper Mississippi River

References

Ohio River crossings
Ohio River crossings
Ohio River crossings
Ohio River
Ohio
Ohio